Bomet is the capital and largest town of Bomet County, Kenya. Bomet town has a total population of 110,963  (2009 census). It is located along the B3 Mai Mahiu-Narok-Kisii road. Bomet city is one of the eight sister cities to Milwaukee.

Etymology 
Bomet is a borrowed word from Swahili language word 'boma' meaning a traditional fenced parameter for cattle to spend the night in. The Kipsigis word 'Kaaptich' is the correct term for such a structure though. The eponymous term was coined following establishment of an industrial scale butchery which used to observe large herds of cattle rounded together in a large scale cow parameter.

History 
Bomet used to be known as Soot or So`t (not to be confused with Sotik) but was eventually renamed Bomet to in part break the confusion between Bomet town and Sotik town.

Administration 
Bomet municipality has six wards (Cheboin, Emkwen, Itembe, Mutarakwa, Township and Tuluapmosonik). These wards are split between Bomet, Chepalungu, Konoin and Sotik constituencies.

Economic activities 
The main economic activity in Bomet is agriculture. Tea is mostly grown in the eastern region of the district bordering the Mau forest. Farmers in the tea-producing region sell their produce to KTDA (Kenya Tea Development Agency) factories such as those at Kapset, Mogogosiek, Rororok, Kapkoros and Tirgaga located in Bomet county. There are also other multinational tea companies such as George Williamson, Unilever and James Finlay (Kenya) Limited which have tea factories in the county.

Medical facilities 
Tenwek Mission Hospital is a 300+ bed hospital and training center located in Bomet. Being the area's primary hospital, Tenwek serves as a referral hospital.

Longisa hospital is a level 4 county government health care facility located in Longisa which has a bed capacity of 144.

High schools in Bomet 
 Moi Siongiroi Girls
 Makimeny secondary school
 Kanusin Secondary School
 Kaptulwa secondary school
 Kaboson Secondary school 
 Chebunyo secondary School 
 Gelegele Secondary School 
 Ndanai Secondary School
 Kapoleseroi Secondary school
 Kipsonoi Secondary School
 Mogor Secondary School
 Longisa Boys High School
 Sigor High school
 Kamureito High School
 Kabusare Secondary School
 Olbutyo Boys High School
 Saseta Girls Secondary School
 Tenwek High School
 Chemaner High School
 Kimuchul Secondary School
 Kipsuter Boys Secondary School
 Kabungut Boys
 Boito Boys High School
 Kapsimotwo Secondary school
 Kapkwen Secondary School
 Manyatta Secondary School
 Solyot Secondary School

References 

Bomet County
Populated places in Rift Valley Province
County capitals in Kenya